WMTC (99.9 FM) is a Christian radio station, licensed to Vancleve, Kentucky, United States. The station is currently owned by the Kentucky Mountain Bible College and features programming from Salem Media Group and Moody Radio.  WMTC's format consists of Southern Gospel music, as well as Christian talk and teaching programs such as Revive our Hearts with Nancy DeMoss Wolgemuth, Focus on the Family, and Unshackled!, as well as children's programming such as Adventures in Odyssey.

References

External links

WMTC website

Breathitt County, Kentucky
Moody Radio affiliate stations
Southern Gospel radio stations in the United States
Radio stations established in 1991
1991 establishments in Kentucky
MTC-FM